Newsboys Live In Concert: God's Not Dead is the second live album from Australian Christian rock band Newsboys. It was recorded in July 2012 at Sonshine Festival and Lifest and released through Sparrow Records on 22 October 2012 and features songs from their albums Born Again (2010), God's Not Dead (2011), and live recordings of Michael Tait singing "He Reigns" and "Something Beautiful".

Track listing

Personnel
 Michael Tait – lead vocals
 Jody Davis – lead guitar, background vocals
 Jeff Frankenstein – keyboards, key vocals
 Duncan Phillips – drums, percussion
 George Moss – rap on "Jesus Freak"

References

2012 live albums
Newsboys albums
Sparrow Records live albums